Wiesław Błach (born 25 March 1962) is a Polish judoka. He competed at the 1988 Summer Olympics and the 1992 Summer Olympics.

References

External links
 

1962 births
Living people
Polish male judoka
Olympic judoka of Poland
Judoka at the 1988 Summer Olympics
Judoka at the 1992 Summer Olympics
Sportspeople from Opole
Competitors at the 1986 Goodwill Games